Stewarts River, a mostly perennial stream of the Mid North Coast region, is located in New South Wales, Australia.

Course and features
Stewarts River rises on the northern slopes of Big Nellie within Coorabakh National Park, west of the village of Hannam Vale, and flows generally east by south and then east, joined by the Camden Haven River, before reaching its mouth at Watson Taylors Lake, south of Camden Haven. The river descends  over its  course.

Stewarts River is transversed by the Pacific Highway north of the village of Johns River, between Coopernook and Kew.

See also

 List of rivers of Australia

References

External links
 

Rivers of New South Wales
Mid North Coast
Mid-Coast Council